Russell Arunbhai Mehta is an Indian businessman. He is the managing director of Rosy Blue India, the Indian arm of the family-owned Indian conglomerate with interests in retail, media, real estate, financial services and diamonds Rosy Blue.

Early life
Russell Mehta is the son of Arunkumar Mehta, a co-founder of B. Arunkumar & Co, founded in 1960 in Mumbai, and which later became Rosy Blue.

Career
Mehta is the managing director of the Indian arm, Rosy Blue India, of the family-owned Indian conglomerate with interests in real estate, financial services, retail and diamonds Rosy Blue.

Rosy Blue is ranked in the top diamond companies of India.

His uncle, Dilip Mehta, appears in both the Panama Papers and the Paradise Papers. "The Mehtas, the prominent Indian diamond business family, have figured on every black-money list obtained by the government or revealed by the ICIJ-The Indian Express investigation so far — Liechtenstein, British Virgin Islands, HSBC Geneva and Panama Papers. They show up in Appleby records as well."

Personal life
Russell Mehta is married to Mona and they have three children.

Mehta's son Viraj Mehta married to Nisha Sheth, daughter of Bharat Sheth of Great Eastern Shipping family in 2012.

In May 2017 in Bahrain, their youngest daughter Diya Mehta married Ayush Jatia, son of Amit Jatia who holds the McDonald's franchise for the west and south of India through his company, Hardcastle Restaurants.

Their other daughter, Shloka Mehta is a director of the Rosy Blue Foundation, and is married to Akash Ambani, the son of billionaire Mukesh Ambani, in March 2019.

References

Living people
Indian chief executives
People named in the Panama Papers
Year of birth missing (living people)
Indian Jains